Mansfield is a town in Nottinghamshire, England, pop. est 100,000

Mansfield may also refer to:

Places

Australia
 Mansfield, Queensland, a suburb of Brisbane
 Mansfield State High School
 Mansfield, Victoria, a town
 Shire of Mansfield, a local government area in Victoria
 Electoral district of Mansfield, Queensland, Australia
 Mansfield Park, South Australia, a suburb of Adelaide

Canada
 Mansfield, Nova Scotia
 Mansfield, Ontario
 Mansfield Township, Quebec, part of the Municipality of Mansfield-et-Pontefract

United Kingdom
 Mansfield, East Ayrshire, a small hamlet in Ayrshire, Scotland
 Mansfield, Nottinghamshire, main town of Mansfield District, Nottinghamshire, England
 Mansfield District, the local council administrative area 
 Mansfield (UK Parliament constituency), largely centred around the eponymous town
 Mansfield Woodhouse, a large village connected to Mansfield, Nottinghamshire

United States
(by state then city)
 Mansfield Lake, Alaska, a lake 16.6 miles from Tok, Alaska
 Mansfield, Arkansas, a city of 1,100
 Mansfield, Connecticut, a town of 24,000
 Mansfield Center, Connecticut, a census-designated place within the town of Mansfield
Mansfield Center Historic District, listed on the NRHP in Connecticut
 Mannfield, Florida, sometimes incorrectly called Mansfield
 Mansfield, Georgia
 Mansfield, Illinois
 Mansfield, Indiana
 Mansfield, Kansas
Mansfield (Lexington, Kentucky), listed on the NRHP in Kentucky
 Mansfield, Louisiana
Mansfield Historic District, Mansfield, Louisiana, listed on the NRHP in Louisiana
Battle of Mansfield, a battle in the Civil War.
Mansfield Battle Park, Mansfield, Louisiana, listed on the NRHP in Louisiana
 Mansfield, Massachusetts
Mansfield station (MBTA)
 Mansfield Township, Freeborn County, Minnesota
 Mansfield, Minnesota
 Mansfield, Missouri
 Mansfield Township, Burlington County, New Jersey
 Mansfield Township, Warren County, New Jersey
 Mansfield, New York
 Mansfield, Ohio, the second largest city in the United States named Mansfield
Ohio State Reformatory, also known as the Mansfield Reformatory, a historic prison located in Mansfield, Ohio.
 Mansfield, Pennsylvania
Mansfield (Mercersburg, Pennsylvania), listed on the NRHP in Pennsylvania
Mansfield University of Pennsylvania
Mansfield Plantation, Georgetown, South Carolina, listed on the NRHP in South Carolina
 Mansfield, South Dakota, population 91 (2020 US Census)
 Mansfield, Tennessee
 Mansfield, Texas, the largest city in the United States named Mansfield
 Mansfield, Vermont (1763–1839), historic township annexed by Underhill, Vermont and Stowe, Vermont
 Mount Mansfield, the highest mountain in Vermont
 Mansfield (Petersburg, Virginia), listed on the NRHP in Virginia
 Mansfield, Washington
 Mansfield, West Virginia

People
 Mansfield (surname), people with the surname
 Mansfield (All-England cricketer, 1778)
 Mansfield Smith-Cumming, British spymaster
 Lord Mansfield (William Murray, 1st Earl of Mansfield) (1705–1793), British jurist
Mansfield Decision of 1772, ruling that there was no legal basis for slavery in the United Kingdom

Other uses
 Mansfield station (disambiguation), stations of the name
 "Mansfield", a song by Elton John, on the album Songs from the West Coast
 Mansfield College, Oxford, a college of Oxford University
 Mansfield Dam near Austin, Texas
 Maureen and Mike Mansfield Foundation, named after Mike Mansfield, dedicated to "advancing understanding and cooperation in U.S.-Asia relations"
 Mansfield Park, novel by Jane Austen
 HMS Mansfield, Royal Navy ships
 USS Mansfield, United States Navy destroyer
 Mansfield University of Pennsylvania 
 Mount Mansfield, the highest peak in Vermont, USA
 Bruce Mansfield Power Plant, a power plant in Shippingport, Pennsylvania

See also 
 Mansfield Park (disambiguation)
 Mansfield Township, New Jersey (disambiguation)
 Mansfeld (disambiguation)
 Manfield (disambiguation)
 Justice Mansfield (disambiguation)